The 2005 Cincinnati Bearcats football team represented the University of Cincinnati in the 2005 NCAA Division I FBS football season. The team, coached by Mark Dantonio, played its home games in Nippert Stadium, as it has since 1924.

Schedule

Roster

Awards and milestones

Big East Conference honors

Offensive player of the week
Week 1: Dustin Grutza

Defensive player of the week
Week 8: Kevin McCullough

Special teams player of the week
Week 8: Chet Ervin

Big East Conference All-Conference Second Team
Corey Smith, LB
Mike Mickens, DB

References

Cincinnati
Cincinnati Bearcats football seasons
Cincinnati Bearcats football